Lady Flammer (born November 9, 1999), is a Mexican luchadora enmascarada (or masked professional wrestler), and is primarily known for her work for The Crash Lucha Libre. She is currently a freelancer, working for The Crash Lucha Libre as well as on the Mexican and independent circuit. Flammer's real name is not a matter of public record, as is often the case with masked wrestlers in Mexico where their private lives are kept a secret from the wrestling fans.

Professional wrestling career
Flammer made her professional wrestling debut on August 29, 2010. Over the next eight years, Flammer competed on the Mexican independent circuit, most notably appearing for independent promotions Federacion Universal De Lucha Libre and Promociones Kdna.

On January 28, 2018, Flammer made her debut on The Crash Lucha Libre teaming up with Latigo in a mixed tag team match where they were defeated by Christi Jaynes and Danny Limelight. On February 10, Flammer and Limelight were defeated by Black Danger and Lacey Lane. In February 2019, Flamer defeated Jaynes, Miranda Alize and Reyna Isis to win The Crash Women's Championship for first time.

Personal life
Lady Flammer is a mother to a son with her partner, The Tiger (son of Apolo Estrada Jr.).

Championships and accomplishments
Kaoz Lucha Libre
Kaoz Women's Tag Team Championship (1 time, current) – with Sexy Dulce
Lucha Libre AAA Worldwide
AAA World Mixed Tag Team Championship (1 time, current) – with Abismo Negro Jr
Lucha Libre Femenil
LLF Championship (1 time)
LLF Tag Team Championship (1 time) – with Lady Puma
Copa Juvenil LLF (2013, 2014)
The Crash Lucha Libre
The Crash Women's Championship (1 time)
Promociones Universal
Promociones Universal Women's Championship (1 time)

Luchas de Apuestas record

Footnotes

References

1999 births
Living people
Mexican female professional wrestlers
Masked wrestlers
Unidentified wrestlers
Sportspeople from Monterrey
Professional wrestlers from Nuevo León